S.S.D. Parma Calcio 1913 is an Italian professional football club based in Parma, Emilia-Romagna, which currently plays in the Serie D. It was founded in 1913 as Parma Foot Ball Club, began playing league football in 1919 and moved into current home the Stadio Ennio Tardini in 1923. Since those early days the club's first team has competed in numerous nationally and internationally organised competitions. All players who have played in 100 or more such matches are listed below. Appearances and goals are for league matches only; substitute appearances are included.

Alessandro Lucarelli is the player who has made most appearances for the club in league competition (333), while Luigi Apolloni has made more appearances than any other in all competitions (384). William Bronzoni is the club's record league goalscorer, having scored 78 league goals during his Parma career; those goals coming in 201 matches in an eight-year period following the Second World War ending in 1953. Hernán Crespo came close to beating that record, but just fell short when he left the club in early 2012, scoring 72 times in the league. He does, however, hold the scoring record for all competitions, having netted 94 times.

List of players 
Appearances and goals are for league matches only. 
Players are listed according to the date of their first team debut for the club.

Statistics correct as of 16 November 2022

Table headers
 Nationality – If a player played international football, the country/countries he played for are shown. Otherwise, the player's nationality is given as their country of birth.
 Parma career – The year of the player's first appearance for Parma to the year of his last appearance.
 Appearances – The number of games appeared in, including those played as a substitute.

Players whose name is in bold currently play for the club.

Club captains 
The current captain is Gianluigi Buffon.

References 

Players
 
Parma
Association football player non-biographical articles